Plastic composite may refer to:
 Wood-plastic composite
 Composite lumber

See also 
 Composite armour
 Composite material
 Fiber-reinforced composite
 Plastic recycling